High Level/Footner Lake Water Aerodrome, formerly , is located  north northwest of High Level, Alberta, Canada.

See also
High Level Airport

References

Defunct seaplane bases in Alberta

Mackenzie County